The name Karima (Arabic: كريمة) is an Arabic given name. In Arabic the meaning of the name Karima is "generous." Karima is the feminine form of the name Karim. It’s a popular name in the Arab countries. 

However, among the Agikuyu of central Kenya, "Karima" refers to a mountain that is small by stature.

Given name
 Karima Adebibe, English-Moroccan actress and model
 Karima Abd-Daif, Moroccan Norwegian politician for the Labour Party
 Karima Brown, South African Journalist
 Karima Delli, French politician
 Karima Medjeded, French judoka
 Karima Shapandar, Marvel comics hero

Places

Karima, Sudan
Crimea

See also
 Insoumise et dévoilée

Arabic feminine given names
Bosnian feminine given names